Dialectica galapagosensis is a moth of the family Gracillariidae. It is known from the Galápagos Islands.

The larvae feed on Macraea laricifolia. They probably mine the leaves of their host plant.

References

Dialectica (moth)
Moths described in 2006